James Todd Rutherford (born October 10, 1970 in Columbia, South Carolina) is an American politician and Democratic member of the South Carolina House of Representatives, representing the 74th District since 1999. He is the Minority Leader of the House.

Early life and education
Rutherford graduated from W.J. Keenan High School in 1988. Rutherford earned his bachelor's degree from Howard University in 1992. He then worked as Legislative Assistant to Congressman Robin Tallon before earning his Juris Doctor degree from the University of South Carolina School of Law in 1996.

After passing the bar, he worked as Assistant Solicitor and Special Prosecutor of Narcotic and Drug Cases in the Fifth Circuit Solicitor's Office. In 1998, he founded the Rutherford Law Firm.

South Carolina General Assembly
Rutherford was elected to the South Carolina General Assembly in 1998 to represent House District 74. He initially served on the Military, Medical and Municipal Affairs Committee before joining the Judiciary Committee in 2002. Rutherford currently serves on the Ways and Means Committee and the Ethics Committee. In 2013, Rutherford was elected Minority Leader.

Rutherford was named Young Democrat of the year in 1999.

In 2007 Rutherford introduced a bill to replace the Confederate battle flag with the South Carolina state flag. However, the bill never received a hearing. In June 2015 the flag was removed with the overwhelming support of the House Democratic Caucus.

Rutherford is a leading proponent of medical marijuana in the South Carolina General Assembly. In 2014, Rutherford filed the "Put Patients First Act," the first of its kind in South Carolina.

Rutherford joined House members Deon Tedder and Roger Kirby in forming the Freedom Caucus of South Carolina, in contrast to the conservative SC Freedom Caucus.

References

External links
official SC House website

Follow the Money – J. Todd Rutherford
2006 2004 2002 2000 1998 campaign contributions

1970 births
20th-century African-American people
21st-century African-American politicians
21st-century American politicians
African-American state legislators in South Carolina
Howard University alumni
Lawyers from Columbia, South Carolina
Living people
Democratic Party members of the South Carolina House of Representatives
Politicians from Columbia, South Carolina
University of South Carolina School of Law alumni